A by-election for the seat of Millner in the Northern Territory Legislative Assembly was held on 21 November 1981. The by-election was triggered by the resignation of Labor member and Leader of the Opposition Jon Isaacs. Labor candidate and future Leader of the Opposition Terry Smith won the election against CLP candidate John Robinson.

Results

References

1981 elections in Australia
Northern Territory by-elections